Alaskan Killer Bigfoot is an American television series on Discovery+. It premiered December 7, 2021. The series follows a team of five men: Ash Naderhoff, Keith Seville, Noah Craig, DJ Brewster, and Kyle McDowell as they allegedly explore Portlock, Alaska, an uninhabited town in which natives were driven from over 70 years ago by a creature called Nantinaq.

Premise 
The town of Portlock, Alaska was established in the 19th century as a cannery, particularly for salmon. However in the 1940s, Portlock became a ghost town, as a terrifying bigfoot-like creature known as Nantinaq chased all the villagers out. Over the course of the series, a team of five men: Ash Naderhoff, Keith Seville, Noah Craig, DJ Brewster, and Kyle McDowell camped out around Portlock and the Port Chatham, area looking for Nantinaq. During the exploration the team is assisted by Portlock descendants Tommy Evans and Frank “Guy” Berestoff.

Episodes

External links 

 Official Website

References 

2021 American television series debuts
Travel Channel original programming
Cryptozoological television series
2020s American reality television series
Television shows set in Alaska
Discovery Channel original programming